The Autopsy is the first EP by American rapper C-Bo, released in 1994 on AWOL Records. It was produced by Mike Mosley and Sam Bostic. It peaked at number 22 on the Billboard Top R&B/Hip-Hop Albums and at number 19 on the Billboard Top Heatseekers. One single was released, "Groovin' On a Sunday". The EP features guest performances from Keak da Sneak & Agerman, together known as Dual Committee, and AWOL Records label-mate Pizzo.

West Coast Mafia Records, C-Bo's own label, reissued The Autopsy in 2003 with bonus tracks.

Track listing
"Autopsy" - 5:20
"Murder Man" (featuring Dual Committee) - 4:27
"America's Nightmare" - 4:42
"Groovin' On a Sunday" - 4:33
"Stompin' In My Steel Toes" (featuring Dual Committee) - 5:13
"Ghetto Flight" (featuring Pizzo) - 4:19

2003 CD reissue bonus tracks
The EP was re-released August 12, 2003 with the following bonus tracks:

"Until We Blow" (featuring Fed-X and 151) - 3:40
"Boy to a Man" (featuring Mississippi) - 4:04

Chart history

References

External links 
 The Autopsy at Discogs
 The Autopsy at MusicBrainz

C-Bo albums
1994 EPs
Self-released EPs
Gangsta rap EPs
G-funk EPs